Morgan is the easternmost town in Orleans County, Vermont, United States. The population was 638 at the 2020 census. The town contains two villages: Morgan and Morgan Center.

History
The town was named for John Morgan, a landholder.

The first settler was Nathan Wilcox in 1800.

During the Civil War the town furnished forty-seven enlisted men, thirteen of whom were killed or died from the effects of wounds or disease.

Morgan was one of only two Vermont towns to vote for Mitt Romney over Barack Obama in the 2012 presidential election.

Geography

According to the United States Census Bureau, the town has a total area of 33.9 square miles (87.7 km2), of which 31.3 square miles (81.0 km2) is land and 2.6 square miles (6.8 km2) (7.71%) is water.

Lake Seymour is contained entirely within the town. It is the second largest lake to be contained solely within the state.

Demographics

As of the census of 2000, there were 669 people, 247 households, and 185 families residing in the town. The population density was 21.4 people per square mile (8.3/km2).  There were 672 housing units at an average density of 21.5 per square mile (8.3/km2). The racial makeup of the town was 98.21% White, 0.30% African American, 0.60% Native American, 0.15% Asian, 0.15% from other races, and 0.60% from two or more races. Hispanic or Latino of any race were 0.90% of the population.

There were 247 households, out of which 35.6% had children under the age of 18 living with them, 61.9% were married couples living together, 8.9% had a female householder with no husband present, and 25.1% were non-families. 18.2% of all households were made up of individuals, and 4.9% had someone living alone who was 65 years of age or older. The average household size was 2.71 and the average family size was 3.03.

In the town, the population was spread out, with 29.4% under the age of 18, 4.0% from 18 to 24, 27.2% from 25 to 44, 28.1% from 45 to 64, and 11.2% who were 65 years of age or older. The median age was 38 years. For every 100 females, there were 108.4 males. For every 100 females age 18 and over, there were 95.0 males.

The median income for a household in the town was $37,292, and the median income for a family was $42,344. Males had a median income of $28,542 versus $18,125 for females. The per capita income for the town was $15,565. About 10.9% of families and 15.0% of the population were below the poverty line, including 20.7% of those under age 18 and 14.9% of those age 65 or over.

Government

Town

 Selectman (2007–2010) – Robie Guyer
 Agent – Jane Malgeri
 Delinquent Tax Collector – Jim Judd
 Auditor – Donna Young
 Lister – Deanna Keenan
 Road Commissioner – Shawn Austin
 Grand Juror – Cyrus Benson
 Grand Juror – Jane Malgeri
 Cemetery Commissioner (2007–2012) – Robert Cargill
 First Constable – Robert Cain
 Second Constable – Greg Wood

Education
No local elementary school 

The local school district supports the E. Taylor Hatton Elementary School.
 Member, School Board (2007–2010) – Kelly Paul
 Member, North Country School District – Mary Roy
 Budget – $561,000

Politics

Ninety percent of those registered turned out to vote in the 2008 general election, highest in the county.

In modern times, Morgan, Vermont is a mostly Republican jurisdiction. The GOP candidates have carried Morgan in five of the last seven presidential elections. In 2008, Barack Obama became the lone Democratic presidential candidate in the last thirty years to win a majority of the vote. In 2012, Morgan was one of only two jurisdictions alongside Maidstone that voted for Mitt Romney. In 2016, Donald Trump improved on Romney's performance, and won the town by a margin of 27 points.

References

External links

 Town of Morgan, Vermont

 
Towns in Vermont
Towns in Orleans County, Vermont